Roadkill is an automotive-themed internet show produced by the MotorTrend Group. It is hosted by former Hot Rod Magazine editor David Freiburger and former technical staff editor Mike Finnegan. Roadkill is primarily filmed in Southern California, with other episodes taking place across the United States, Canada and Australia.

Roadkill aired on YouTube from 2012 until March 2018, when the program moved exclusively to MotorTrend On Demand. It is currently available on Discovery+.

In 2015, the show was sponsored by the American automaker Dodge. Episodes regularly exceeded millions of views, often reaching over a million in 72 hours.

In August 2015 it was announced that TEN: The Enthusiast Network would be publishing a quarterly magazine titled Roadkill Magazine. On 12 January 2018, Mike Finnegan announced on The Kibbe and Finnegan Show that Roadkill Magazine had ceased publishing.

Cast

Main 

David Freiburger: has spent the vast majority of his career working for the various brands now owned by Motor Trend Group.
Mike Finnegan: employed by Motor Trend Group since 2009. He was also a staff editor at Hot Rod magazine.

Featured 

Lucky Costa: co-host of Hot Rod Garage. He appeared previously on the Chip Foose show Overhaulin'. Lucky is called in when a vehicle needs extra help.
Tony Angelo: former co-host of Hot Rod Garage. Tony is an accomplished mechanic and former racer. Tony departed the Motor Trend group in March 2022.
Steve Dulcich: a mechanic. Steve's farm serves as the backdrop for Roadkill Garage.
Mike Cotten and David Newbern: friends of Finnegan, co-hosts of "Faster with Finnegan," and also featured on "Finnegan's Garage." 
Steve Magnante: an automotive historian and host of "Roadkill's Junkyard Gold."
Steve Brulé: co-host of Engine Masters.
Rick Péwé: a former editor of Petersen's 4-Wheel & Offroading Magazine.
Elana Scherr: the former Editor-In-Chief of Roadkill magazine and the Roadkill.com website.
Terry the Terrier: a shop dog at Steve Dulcich's garage.

Spin-offs and magazine 
Roadkill has three spin-offs series; Roadkill Garage, Roadkill's Junkyard Gold, and Faster with Finnegan, as well as a companion series called Roadkill Extra. All are available on Discovery+.

Roadkill Garage is hosted by David Freiburger and Steve Dulcich. An episode involves modifying or repairing a roadkill vehicle, often reclaimed from Dulcich's farm.

Roadkill's Junkyard Gold features automotive historian Steve Magnante visiting junkyards and discussing the history of different models of vehicles he encounters, while also being tasked with finding new vehicles for Roadkill.

Faster with Finnegan features Mike Finnegan, Mike Cotten, and David Newbern. It features the trio repairing and modifying vehicles, many of which were previously featured on Roadkill.

Roadkill Extra is a shorter format with content such as question and answer sessions, tech tips, project updates, and other Roadkill information. Episodes range from 2 to 15 minutes in length. MotorTrend ceased publication of "extras" for all of their web shows at the end of 2020.

In 2015 the quarterly Roadkill magazine was launched. As of 12 January 2018 Mike Finnegan announced on The Kibbe and Finnegan Show that Roadkill Magazine had been cut.

Vehicles

Features and expressions
"Because Roadkill": a comedic expression to justify a fiscally irresponsible or unnecessary piece of work on a vehicle, or to rationalise an inexplicable problem.
"Best day at work ever": a sarcastic retort.
"It'll be fine" or "It'll work perfectly/flawlessly": typically followed by a vehicle's failure.
"Don't get it right, just get it running": Freiburger's philosophy. 
"Mint": Freiburger's description of any vehicle that has working doors, a front windshield, and headlights.
"It'll DZUS right back": relating to a quarter turn DZUS brand fastener, which are used to hold panels of racecars. Used to describe the difficulty in reattaching a part removed from a vehicle.
"Bam!": Freiburger's frequent exclamation.
"I declare victory": Finnegan's exclamation.
"That'll buff out": relating to damage on a vehicle.
"Failure is like success": as failure is common within episodes, this retort is intended as a joke when things go wrong.
Freiburger rarely wears actual shoes on the show. 
Cable ties are used for budget alterations.
Finneganeconomics, or Finnenomics, a comedic theory of economic loss, relating to losing money on a car you restore.
A comedic focus on the important elements of a vehicle such as wheels, neglecting equally important elements such as the engine.
Referring to high quality parts being fitted to scrap cars.
"Keep lowering your standards until you achieve a goal".
"Tony broke it": a running joke of Tony Angelo breaking high performance cars.
"I know the rules, so I'm allowed to break them": Finnegan's go-to expression before butchering a vehicle.
"No gauges hence no bad news": inferring ignorance is bliss.

References

External links
 
 Roadkill on YouTube
 Dodge 

Motor Trend Group
American non-fiction web series
Automotive web series